Royal Bounty first appeared in Lloyd's Register (LR) in the Register of Shipping (RS) in 1811. A United States privateer captured and burnt her in 1812 after a notable single ship action.

Career
Both gave her origin as "Foreign", with the RS also describing her as "old". An advertisement noted that Royal Bounty, of 338 tons (bm), would be offered for sale on 8 February 1811 at the Leith Coffeeroom. It noted that she had just undergone a thorough repair and was ready for sea.

Fate
Royal Bounty, Captain Henry Gamble, sailed from Hull on 8 June 1812, bound for Prince Edward Island. She had a crew of 18 men and also carried four passengers, one a woman. The United States privateer Yankee, Captain Oliver Wilson, captured Royal Bounty off Saint Pierre and Miquelon on 1 August. The 1813 volume of RS carried the annotation "captured" under her name.

Captain Gamble was unaware that war between the United States and Great Britain had broken out. A vessel flying the Union Jack pursued him, then raised American colours, and fired on him. Gamble and his crew returned fire. Royal Bounty  struck after an engagement of an hour and a half. The boy manning the helm had been killed, and Gamble, his second mate, and two other crew wounded. The chief mate was also wounded by some shots after Royal Bounty had struck. American casualties consisted of two men wounded. The American vessel was the privateer Yankee, of Bristol, Rhode Island, of 18 guns, and a crew of 120 men under Captain Wilson. The Americans took all aboard Royal Bounty onto Yankee, where they treated the wounded. The Americans dealt roughly with the rest of the crew.

A little later Yankee captured Thetis, of Poole, Pack, master, whose crew abandoned her and escaped. Thetis was carrying coals for Sydney. Yankee set fire to Thetis, and apparently Royal Bounty as well. Royal Bounty had been sailing in ballast and so had no valuable cargo. The Americans put Gamble and his men aboard a boat, in which they were able to reach Placentia safely.

As noted earlier, some American reports of the action doubled Royal Bountys burthen, and gave her armament as sixteen 6-pounder guns.

Notes

Citations

References
 

1811 ships
Age of Sail merchant ships of England
Captured ships
Maritime incidents in 1812